Harald Krämer (born 13 February 1964) was a German footballer. He played club football with Eintracht Frankfurt, SK Sturm Graz, Chemnitzer FC and FC Hansa Rostock.

Career 
In his youth time Krämer played with VfB Unterliederbach before his move to Eintracht Frankfurt. With the Eintracht Under 17 he won the German championship in 1980, with the Under 19 team in 1982.  There he played along with future professionals like Thomas Berthold, Ralf Falkenmayer, Uwe Müller, Holger Friz and Hans-Jürgen Gundelach. In 1983 he signed his first professional contract at the first team. Until his departure in 1987 he made 61 Bundesliga appearances and scored 15 goals. 

Then the forward move to Austrian Bundesliga team SK Sturm Graz. In 1987–88 he was the third highest goal scorer after SK Rapid Wien's Zoran Stojadinović and Walter Knaller of Admira/Wacker.  The domestic newspaper Kronenzeitung nicknamed Krämer Goldköpfchen (Little golden head) due to his strong aerial capabilities.

From 1990, Krämer signed for a year for Chemnitzer FC and then Hansa Rostock. In 1992, he finished his professional career due to sports invalidity. After that, Krämer played as an amateur for FC Ligist in Austria and Viktoria Kelsterbach before returned to his hometown club VfB Unterliederbach where he hung up his boots in 2000.

Nowadays Krämer regularly plays in the Eintracht Frankfurt alumni veterans teams along with former teammates like Charly Körbel, Ronny Borchers, Ralf Falkenmayer, Norbert Nachtweih and Ralf Weber.

References

External links
Harald Krämer at eintracht-archiv.de

1964 births
Living people

German footballers
Bundesliga players
Germany under-21 international footballers
Eintracht Frankfurt players
SK Sturm Graz players
Chemnitzer FC players
FC Hansa Rostock players
Expatriate footballers in Austria
Footballers from Frankfurt
Association football forwards